Siah Choqa (also Romanized as Sīāh Choqā) is a village in Sahneh Rural District, in the Central District of Sahneh County, Kermanshah Province, Iran. At the 2006 census, its population was 659, in 151 families.

References 

Populated places in Sahneh County